Bay Tamer (also Romanized as Bāy Tamer, Baytamr, and Bāytamer; also known as Baīt-ī-‘Ūmr, Bā-ye Tamer, and Beyt-e ‘Amr) is a village in Yalghuz Aghaj Rural District, Serishabad District, Qorveh County, Kurdistan Province, Iran. At the 2006 census, its population was 98, in 21 families. The village is populated by Kurds.

References 

Towns and villages in Qorveh County
Kurdish settlements in Kurdistan Province